Maud Forget (born May 7, 1982) is a French actress best known for her roles in "Mauvaises fréquentations" (1999, "Bad Company"), and "La vie promise" (2002, "Ghost River"/"The Promised Life") opposite Isabelle Huppert and Pascal Greggory. She has also starred in other films such as "Tu ne marcheras jamais seul" and "U" (voice acting), and in several short films and television productions.

In her latest effort, Forget portrays one of the leading characters in the movie "Frontier(s)", directed by Xavier Gens.

Filmography

Cinema 
 1999 : Mauvaises fréquentations / Bad Company, directed by Jean-Pierre Améris : Delphine Vitrac
 2001 : Tu ne marcheras jamais seul, directed by Gilles Chevalier
 2002 : La Vie promise, directed by Olivier Dahan
 2006 : U, cartoon directed by Serge Élissalde and Grégoire Solotareff
 2007 : Frontier(s), directed by Xavier Gens
 2008 : Fracassés, directed by Franck Llopis
 2011 : Augustine, short movie directed by Jean-Claude Monod and Jean-Christophe Valtat
 2017 : Silhouette, short movie directed by Bertrand Cazor

Film Director 
 2014 : (En)Vie, short movie

Television 
 2001 : Paranoïa, directed by Patrick Poubel : Lucie
 2001 : Comme une allumette], directed by Clémence Jean-Jean
 2001 : Hansel et Gretl, directed by Cyril Paris
 2002 : Le cauchemar de Clara, directed by Douglas Law
 2004 : Clau Clau l'oiseau, directed by Cyril Paris
 2005 : Venus et Apollon, directed by Tonie Marshall
 2006 : Fotographik, directed by Xavier Gens
 2006 : Fabien Cosma, directed by Jean-Claude Sussfeld
 2006 : Alice Nevers : le juge est une femme, directed by Joyce Bunuel
 2007 : H.B. Human Bomb - Maternelle en otage, directed by Patrick Poubel
 2009 : Comprendre et pardonner, directed by Michel Hassan
 2010 : Merci papa, merci maman, directed by Vincent Giovanni
 2011 : Prunelle et Mélodie, directed by Mathieu Simonet
 2012 : La ballade de Lucie, directed by Sandrine Ray
 2012 : Pari, directed by Jovanka Sopalovic
 2013 : Le café des veuves, directed by Geoffroy Koeberlé
 2013 : Origines, season 1, directed by Jérôme Navarro
 2015 : Origines, season 2, directed by Nicolas Herdt
 2018 : Art of Crime, Une ombre au tableau

Theatre 
 2005 : L'autre ou le jardin oublié, directed by Patrice Paris, théâtre Montmartre-Galabru Paris
 2008 : Adam et Eve, directed by Eric Théobald, théâtre de la Gaîté-Montparnasse Paris
 2016 : Résistantes, by Franck Monsigny, directed by Stanislas Grassian, Théâtre Le Petit Louvre Festival off d'Avignon

References

External links

1982 births
Living people
People from Saint-Claude, Jura
French television actresses
French film actresses